Malik Anwar Taj is a Pakistani politician who has been a member of the National Assembly of Pakistan from August 2018 till January 2023.

Political career
He was elected to the National Assembly of Pakistan as a candidate of Pakistan Tehreek-e-Insaf (PTI) from Constituency NA-23 (Charsadda-I) in 2018 Pakistani general election. He received 59,371 votes and defeated Haji Zafar Ali Khan, a candidate of Muttahida Majlis-e-Amal (MMA).

References

Living people
Pakistani MNAs 2018–2023
Year of birth missing (living people)